There have been three baronetcies created for members of the Glyn family, two in the Baronetage of Great Britain and one in the Baronetage of the United Kingdom.

The Glyn Baronetcy, of Ewell in the County of Surrey, was created in the Baronetage of Great Britain on 29 September 1759 for Richard Glyn. He was a banker and also represented the City of London and Coventry in Parliament. In 1942 the title was inherited by Sir Richard Fitzgerald Glyn, 4th Baronet, of Gaunt's House (see below), who became the eighth Baronet of Ewell as well. The ninth baronet was a Conservative politician.

The Glyn Baronetcy, of Gaunt's House in the County of Dorset, was created in the Baronetage of Great Britain on 22 November 1800 for Richard Carr Glyn. He was the fourth son of the first baronet of the 1759 creation. Carr-Glyn was also a banker and sat as a member of parliament for St Ives. In 1798 he served, like his father before him, as Lord Mayor of London. The fourth baronet of this creation succeeded to the Glyn Baronetcy of Ewell in 1942. The titles have remained united ever since. Another member of the Glyn family was George Glyn, 1st Baron Wolverton. He was the fourth son of the first baronet of the 1800 creation.

The Glyn Baronetcy, of Farnborough Downs in the County of Berkshire, was created in the Baronetage of the United Kingdom on 21 January 1934 for Ralph Glyn (a great-grandson of the first Carr-Glyn baronet), who was also later created Baron Glyn.

Glyn baronets, of Ewell (1759)

Sir Richard Glyn, 1st Baronet (1711–1773)
Sir George Glyn, 2nd Baronet (–1814)
Sir Lewen Powell Glyn, 3rd Baronet (1801–1840)
Sir George Lewen Glyn, 4th Baronet (1804–1885)
Sir George Turbervill Glyn, 5th Baronet (1841–1891)
Sir Gervas Powell Glyn, 6th Baronet (1862–1921)
Sir Arthur Robert Glyn, 7th Baronet (1870–1942)
Sir Richard Fitzgerald Glyn, 8th Baronet (1875–1960)
Sir Richard Hamilton Glyn, 9th Baronet (1907–1980)
Sir Richard Lindsay Glyn, 10th Baronet (born 1943)

Glyn baronets, of Gaunt's House (1800)
Sir Richard Carr Glyn, 1st Baronet (1755–1838)
Sir Richard Plumptre Glyn, 2nd Baronet (1787–1863)
Sir Richard George Glyn, 3rd Baronet (1831–1918)
Sir Richard Fitzgerald Glyn, 4th Baronet (1875–1960) (succeeded as eighth Baronet of Ewell in 1942)
see above for further holders

Glyn baronets, of Farnborough Downs (1934)
see Baron Glyn

See also
Glynne baronets
Baron Wolverton
Baron Glyn

References
Kidd, Charles, Williamson, David (editors). Debrett's Peerage and Baronetage (1990 edition). New York: St Martin's Press, 1990, 

Baronetcies in the Baronetage of Great Britain
Extinct baronetcies in the Baronetage of the United Kingdom
Glyn family
1759 establishments in Great Britain
1934 establishments in the United Kingdom